Currie Community High School is a six-year comprehensive school serving the south-west of the City of Edinburgh, Scotland.  The school roll currently stands at 727 of whom 20% attend as a result of parental placing requests. The school's feeder primary schools are Currie Primary School, Nether Currie Primary School and Juniper Green Primary School. Several Labour Party politicians have made visits, including former First Minister Henry McLeish, also more recently First Minister Jack McConnell, Sarah Boyack and David Miliband. It has also been visited by William Hague and Malcolm Rifkind.

The school is a Community High School, offering classes, activities and events to the local community.

History 
The present building opened in 1966 and was extensively refurbished between 1996 – 1998.

Notable alumni

 Stephen Carter, Baron Carter of Barnes
 Kate Green, Labour MP
 Kathleen Jamie, writer, poet. Professor at Stirling University.
Lewis MacDougall, Actor 
 Andrew Oldcorn, professional golfer
 Andrew Oswald, Professor of Economics, University of Warwick
 Peter Sawkins, Winner of The Great British Bake Off 2020
 Matt Scott, rugby player, multiple caps for Scotland

Headteachers 
Mrs Jenifer Hutchison (2020-) 
Ms  Doreen McKinnon (2014-2020)
Ms  Kate Paton (2007-2013)
Dr  Dorothy White (2005-2007)
Mr  Eric Melvin (1992-2005)
Mr  Ronald Paul (N/a - 1992)

External links
Currie Community High School Website
Currie Community High School's page on Scottish Schools Online

References 

Secondary schools in Edinburgh
1966 establishments in Scotland
Educational institutions established in 1966